Stefano Galvani was the defending champion but lost in the quarterfinals.
Thomas Oger defeated Petros Chrysochos 4–6, 6–3, 6–3 in the final.

Draw

Draw

References
 Main Draw

Men's Singles